The Red Lion Hotel  is an AA 4 star hotel located in the English seaside town of Cromer in the county of Norfolk, United Kingdom.

Location
The Red Lion Hotel sits on the junction of Tucker street and Brook street in the centre of Cromer. The hotel sits on the cliff top above the fisherman’s beach and has commanding views across the sea and the towns Victorian Pier.

Description
The hotel has 14 en-suite rooms in total, most of which have a sea view. The reception area is on the ground floor of the hotel. There is a large bar with a spacious lounge which is open to guests and non-residence. the bar as a good range of beers including several locally brewed real ales. the hotel is a member of CAMRA and is listed in the AA Good Pub Guide.

History
The Red Lion is one of the oldest inns in the town of Cromer. The first recorded inn keeper was named as Sherman Cutler in the year of 1766. The current hotel was rebuilt on the site of much older hostelry in 1887 by a Mr John Smith of London. The building has evolved over the years to the building seen today. During this re-build the site was extended with the acquisition and demolition of several fishermen's cottages at the rear of the inn. These were replaced by assembly rooms which still form part of the hotel today. There is some documentation which suggest that the 1887 works were carried out by a local builder by the name of George Riches.

Gallery

References

Cromer
Hotels in Cromer
Hotels in North Norfolk
Hotels in Norfolk